WTTH (96.1 FM) is an urban adult contemporary music formatted radio station licensed to Margate City, New Jersey. It serves the general Atlantic City, New Jersey, metro area.  Its studios are located at the Bayport One complex in West Atlantic City, and its transmitter is located in the Casino district in Atlantic City.

History
WTTH first signed on as WFOU in 1989. It first changed its callsign to WMXL in 1990 before becoming WTTH, branded as "The Touch," in 1991. As The Touch, WTTH plays an Urban AC format.

The Touch once operated a simulcast on 105.5 WBNJ in Cape May County from 1994 until 1999. The simulcast then moved to 93.1/WDTH until 2009, when WDTH became Easy 93.1.

In 2004 and 2005, WTTH and its then-simulcast WDTH were two of the earliest stations in the country to flip to an all-Christmas format.

Programming
WTTH is the Atlantic City home of the nationally syndicated "Steve Harvey Morning Show." Up until August 9, 2019, the station was home to the "Tom Joyner Morning Show." Music the rest of the day is automated Urban AC music. On weeknights, the station simulcasts "The Sweat Hotel" wth Keith Sweat. On December 13, 2011, WTTH began airing "Kissing After Dark" hosted by Lenny Green, a syndicated show originating from WBLS in New York City. Every Saturday at 9 AM, In the Mix with Mayor Marty Small of Atlantic City is hosted.

On weekends, WTTH airs mostly classic hip hop songs, in what it calls "Throwback Weekend." On Saturdays, the station simulcasts the popular "Bob Pantano Saturday Night Dance Party" from Philadelphia's WOGL. On Sundays, WTTH airs the nationally syndicated "Gospel Traxx" hosted by Walt "Baby" Love. It also airs "The Sunday Breakfast Club," hosted by Atlantic City personality Ray Tyler, currently the station's only live DJ.

History of callsign
The callsign WTTH was previously assigned to an AM station in Port Huron, Michigan, that began broadcasting December 6, 1947. A sister station, WTTH-FM began broadcasting that same day.

References

External links 

TTH
Margate City, New Jersey
Urban adult contemporary radio stations in the United States
Radio stations established in 1989
1989 establishments in New Jersey